The 2017 FIVB Men's Club World Championship was the 13th edition of the tournament. It was held in Poland for the first time from 12 to 17 December 2017. Eight teams competed in the tournament, including two wild cards.

Russia's Zenit Kazan defeated Italy's Cucine Lube Civitanova in the final and won the title for the first time. Brazil's Sada Cruzeiro claimed the bronze medal by defeating Poland's PGE Skra Bełchatów in the 3rd place match. Osmany Juantorena from Cucine Lube Civitanova was elected the Most Valuable Player.

Qualification

Pools composition

Squads

Venues

Pool standing procedure
 Number of matches won
 Match points
 Sets ratio
 Points ratio
 If the tie continues as per the points ratio between two teams, the priority will be given to the team which won the last match between them. When the tie in points ratio is between three or more teams, a new classification of these teams in the terms of points 1, 2 and 3 will be made taking into consideration only the matches in which they were opposed to each other.

Match won 3–0 or 3–1: 3 match points for the winner, 0 match points for the loser
Match won 3–2: 2 match points for the winner, 1 match point for the loser

Preliminary round
All times are Central European Time (UTC+01:00).

Pool A

|}

|}

Pool B

|}

|}

Final round
All times are Central European Time (UTC+01:00).

Semifinals

|}

3rd place match

|}

Final

|}

Final standing

Awards

Most Valuable Player
 Osmany Juantorena (Cucine Lube Civitanova)
Best Setter
 Aleksandr Butko (Zenit Kazan)
Best Outside Spikers
 Wilfredo León (Zenit Kazan)
 Yoandy Leal (Sada Cruzeiro)

Best Middle Blockers
 Aleksey Samoylenko (Zenit Kazan)
 Robertlandy Simón (Sada Cruzeiro)
Best Opposite Spiker
 Tsvetan Sokolov (Cucine Lube Civitanova)
Best Libero
 Jenia Grebennikov (Cucine Lube Civitanova)

See also
2017 FIVB Volleyball Women's Club World Championship

References

External links
Official website 
Final Standing
Awards
Formula
Statistics

FIVB Volleyball Men's Club World Championship
FIVB Men's Club World Championship
International volleyball competitions hosted by Poland
FIVB
FIVB Volleyball
Sports competitions in Kraków
Sports competitions in Łódź
Sport in Opole